Antonia Moraiti (born May 2, 1977) is a Greek water polo player and Olympic silver medalist. She is part of the Greek women's national team.

Career
Moraiti won a silver medal at the 2004 Summer Olympics in 2004 Athens.

See also
 List of Olympic medalists in water polo (women)

References

External links
 

1977 births
Living people
Greek female water polo players
Olympic water polo players of Greece
Olympiacos Women's Water Polo Team players
Water polo players at the 2004 Summer Olympics
Olympic silver medalists for Greece
Olympic medalists in water polo
Medalists at the 2004 Summer Olympics
Water polo players from Athens
21st-century Greek women